Paul Li, or Li Jen-kuei (born 20 September 1936), is a research fellow at the Institute of Linguistics, Academia Sinica in Taipei, Taiwan. Li is a leading specialist on Formosan languages and has published dictionaries on the Pazeh and Kavalan languages.

References
Chang, Henry Yungli, Lillian Mei-chin Huang, and Dah-an Ho (eds.). Streams converging into an ocean: festschrift in honor of Professor Paul Jen-kuei Li on his 70th birthday [百川匯海: 李壬癸先生七秩壽慶論文集]. Taipei: Institute of Linguistics, Academia Sinica, 2006.
Curriculum Vitae

External links
Profile at Academic Sinica's website

1936 births
Linguists of Austronesian languages
Linguists of Formosan languages
Linguists from Taiwan
People from Yilan County, Taiwan
Living people